Scotura transversa is a moth of the family Notodontidae. It is found in French Guiana, Suriname and Guyana.

References

Moths described in 1906
Notodontidae of South America